The Fullerian Chairs at the Royal Institution in London, England, were established by John 'Mad Jack' Fuller.

Fullerian Professors of Physiology & Comparative Anatomy
 1834–1837 Peter Mark Roget
 1837–1838 Robert Edmond Grant
 1841–1844 Thomas Rymer Jones
 1844–1848 William Benjamin Carpenter
 1848–1851 William W. Gull
 1851–1855 Thomas Wharton Jones
 1855–1858 Thomas Henry Huxley
 1858–1862 Richard Owen
 1862–1865 John Marshall
 1865–1869 Thomas Henry Huxley
 1869–1872 Michael Foster
 1872–1875 William Rutherford
 1875–1878 Alfred Henry Garrod
 1878–1881 Edward Albert Sharpey-Schafer
 1881–1884 John Gray McKendrick
 1884–1886 Arthur Gamgee
 1887 (vacant)
 1888–1891 George John Romanes
 1891–1894 Victor Horsley
 1894–1897 Charles Stewart
 1897–1898 Augustus Desiré Waller
 1898–1901 Ray Lankester
 1901–1904 Allan Macfadyen
 1904–1906 Louis Compton Miall
 1906–1909 William Stirling
 1909–1912 Frederick Walker Mott
 1912–1915 William Bateson
 1915–1918 Charles Scott Sherrington
 1918–1924 Arthur Keith
 1924–1927 Joseph Barcroft
 1927–1930 Julian Sorell Huxley
 1930–1933 John Burdon Sanderson Haldane
 1933–1935 Grafton Elliot Smith
 1935–1937 Edward Mellanby
 1937–1941 Frederick Keeble
 1941–1944 Jack Cecil Drummond
 1944–1947 James Gray
 1947–1953 Edward James Salisbury
 1953–1957 Harold Munro Fox
 1957–1961 John Zachary Young
 1961–1967 Richard John Harrison
 1967–1973 Andrew Fielding Huxley
 1973–1979 Max Ferdinand Perutz
 1979–1985 David Chilton Phillips
 1985–1991 John Bertrand Gurdon
 1991–1999 Anne McLaren
 1999–2009 Susan Greenfield

References

Bibliography
 

Lists of office-holders in London
Royal Institution
Lists of scientists by membership